Enrique García Álvarez (1896–1971) was a Spanish-Mexican actor.

Early life and career 
García Álvarez was born in Langreo, Asturias in 1896. He began his career in 1922. In 1938, near the end of the Spanish Civil War, he fled to Paris, France, where he was helped by Maurice Chevalier, with which help he went into exile Mexico, where he would establish and live until shortly before his death. He debuted in the cinema in Mexico in 1940, where he would work with Cantinflas and Luis Buñuel in the latter's Mexican phase. He founded the magazine La Voz del Actor and received the Diosas de Plata award (from the Cinematographic Journalists of Mexico, PECIME) for his role in Buñuel's The Exterminating Angel (1962).

García Álvarez was married to Carmen Collado and died of a heart attack in 1971 (other sources erroneously state 1973) in Valencia, his wife's hometown, where she was recovering from an eye operation.

Filmography

El rápido de las 9.15 (1941)
The Eternal Secret (1942)
The Lieutenant Nun (1944)
Symphony of Life (1946)
Five Faces of Woman (1947)
Jalisco Fair (1948)
The Genius (1948)
The Magician (1949)
The Martyr of Calvary (1952)
Pain (1953)
La intrusa (1954)
Tehuantepec (1954)
 The Price of Living (1954)
Adventures of Joselito and Tom Thumb (1960)
The Exterminating Angel (1962)
Simon of the Desert (1965)
The Partisan of Villa (1967)

References

Bibliography
 Arjona, Manuel Palomino. Dramaturgia Asturiana Contemporánea. Lulu, 2019.

External links
 

1896 births
1971 deaths
Mexican male film actors
Spanish male film actors
Spanish emigrants to Mexico
People from Langreo
Actors from Asturias